C. pallida may refer to:

 Cadrema pallida, a species of fly
 Caladenia pallida, a species of orchid
 Calcaritis pallida, a species of moth
 Calceolaria pallida, a species of flowering plant
 Calleida pallida, a species of beetle
 Calliclava pallida, a species of sea snail
 Camissoniopsis pallida, a species of evening primrose
 Campanula pallida, a species of bellflower
 Cantharis pallida, a species of soldier beetle
 Caphys pallida, a species of snout moth
 Carya pallida, a species of hickory
 Castiarina pallida, a species of beetle
 Castilleja pallida, a species of Indian paintbrush
 Cataxia pallida, a species of spider
 Celtis pallida, a species of hackberry
 Centris pallida, a species of bee
 Centrolepis pallida, a species of flowering plant
 Ceranthia pallida, a species of fly
 Cerithiopsis pallida, a species of sea snail
 Cetonia pallida, a species of beetle
 Chaetophiloscia pallida, a species of woodlouse in the family Philosciidae
 Chamaepsila pallida, a species of fly
 Chamaesaracha pallida, a species of nightshade
 Chelidonura pallida, a species of sea slug
 Cheritra pallida, a species of butterfly
 Cheumatopsyche pallida, a species of caddisfly in the subfamily Hydropsychinae
 Chionochloa pallida, a species of tussock grass
 Chloronia pallida, a species of dobsonfly
 Chloroplaga pallida, a species of moth in the subfamily Chloephorinae
 Chrysoperla pallida, a species of lacewing
 Chusquea pallida, a species of bamboo
 Cicurina pallida, a species of spider in the family Dictynidae
 Clermontia pallida, a species of Hawaiian lobelioid
 Clivina pallida, a species of ground beetle
 Clostera pallida, a species of moth
 Clubionina pallida, a species of sac spider
 Cnodontes pallida, a species of butterfly
 Coccoloba pallida, a species of flowering plant
 Cologania pallida, a species of legume
 Columnea pallida, a species of flowering plant
 Commelina pallida, a species of dayflower
 Connomyia pallida, a species of robber fly
 Corbula pallida, a species of clam
 Coryphantha pallida, a species of cactus
 Corythucha pallida, a species of lace bug
 Cosmotoma pallida, a species of longhorn beetle
 Costasiella pallida, a species of sea slug
 Crambidia pallida, a species of moth
 Cranioleuca pallida, the Pallid Spinetail, a species of bird
 Crataerina pallida, the swift lousefly, a species of biting fly
 Crematogaster pallida, a species of ant
 Crotalaria pallida, a species of legume
 Cryptotreta pallida, a species of fly
 Ctenusa pallida, a species of moth
 Cyathissa pallida, a species of moth
 Cyclothone pallida, a species of bristlemouth
 Cymbalaria pallida, a species of flowering plant
 Cymosafia pallida, a species of moth
 Cyrtandra pallida, a species of flowering plant
 Cytora pallida, a species of land snail

Synonyms
 Canna pallida, a synonym for Canna indica, a species of flowering plant
 Cassida pallida, a synonym for Cassida flaveola, a species of leaf beetle
 Catocala pallida, a synonym for Catocala amatrix, a species of moth
 Celosia pallida, a synonym for Celosia argentea, a species of cockscomb
 Chalcophora pallida, a synonym for Chalcophora angulicollis, a species of beetle
 Chionochloa pallida, a synonym for Rytidosperma pallidum, a species of grass
 Cirrhaea pallida, a synonym for Cirrhaea loddigesii, a species of orchid
 Cissus pallida, a synonym for Cissus adnata, a species of woody vine
 Cloeon pallida, a synonym for Cloeon dipterum, a species of mayfly
 Coleophora pallida, a synonym for Coleophora tanaceti, a species of moth
 Colias pallida, a synonym for Colias erate, a species of butterfly
 Coris pallida, a synonym for Coris batuensis, the Batu coris, a species of wrasse
 Cryphia pallida, a synonym for Cryphia pallidioides, a species of moth
 Curtomerus pallida, a synonym for Curtomerus flavus, a species of beetle
 Cyclosia pallida, a synonym for Cyclosia papilionaris, a species of moth